Goodnight Sweetheart may refer to:
"Goodnite, Sweetheart, Goodnite", a 1954 song written by Calvin Carter and James "Pookie" Hudson
Goodnight Sweetheart (TV series), a 1990s British sitcom
Goodnight, Sweetheart (film), a 1944 American comedy film
Goodnight Sweetheart (album), a 1996 album by David Kersh
"Goodnight Sweetheart" (Ray Noble, Jimmy Campbell and Reg Connelly song), a 1931 song written by Ray Noble, Jimmy Campbell, and Reg Connelly
"Goodnight Sweetheart" (Joe Diffie song), 1992, also covered by David Kersh
"Goodnight Sweetheart", a 1978 song by Frankie Miller from Double Trouble
"Goodnight Sweetheart" (All Saints), an episode of All Saints